The Squeaker (German: Der Zinker) is a 1931 German crime film directed by Martin Frič and Karel Lamač and starring Lissy Arna, Karl Ludwig Diehl and Fritz Rasp. It is an adaptation of the 1927 Edgar Wallace novel The Squeaker. This adaptation introduced the mix of suspense and comedy that would come to define numerous German Wallace adaptations over the following decades. Lamač followed it up with another Wallace film The Ringer in 1932. The film's sets were designed by the art director Heinz Fenchel. It was shot at the Halensee Studios in Berlin and on location in Prague.

Cast
 Lissy Arna as Lillie / Millie Trent 
 Karl Ludwig Diehl as Captain Leslie 
 Fritz Rasp as Frank Sutton
 Peggy Norman as Beryl Stedman, seine Nichte 
 Paul Hörbiger as Josuah Harras, Reporter
 S. Z. Sakall as Bill "Billy" Anerley 
 Robert Thoeren as Charles "Charly" Tillmann
 John Mylong as Harry "Juwelen Harry" Webber 
 Ernest Reicher as Inspektor Elford, Scotland Yard
 Karl Forest as Sergeant Miller
 Fritz Greiner as Falschspieler
 Marianne Kupfer as Zena
 Antonie Jaeckel as Garderobiere im 'Leopard-Club'

See also
 The Squeaker (1930)
 The Squeaker (1937)
 The Squeaker (1963)

References

Bibliography
 Bergfelder, Tim. International Adventures: German Popular Cinema and European Co-Productions in the 1960s. Berghahn Books, 2005.

External links
 

1931 films
1930s mystery films
German mystery films
Films of the Weimar Republic
1930s German-language films
German black-and-white films
Films directed by Martin Frič
Films directed by Karel Lamač
Films based on works by Edgar Wallace
Films set in London
Films shot at Halensee Studios
Films shot in Prague
1930s German films